A Study in Scarlet is a 1933 American Pre-Code mystery thriller film directed by Edwin L. Marin and starring Reginald Owen as Sherlock Holmes and Anna May Wong as Mrs. Pyke. The title comes from Arthur Conan Doyle's 1887 novel of the same name, the first in the Holmes series, but the screenplay by Robert Florey was original.

Production

Despite her billing, Anna May Wong only appears on screen for less than ten minutes. Reginald Owen had played Dr. Watson in Sherlock Holmes the previous year; Owen was one of a small number of actors to play both Holmes and Watson. Some of the other actors who played both roles are Jeremy Brett, who played Watson on stage in the United States prior to adopting the mantle of Holmes on British television, Howard Marion-Crawford, who played Holmes on British radio and Watson on American television, Carleton Hobbs, who played both roles in British radio adaptations, and Patrick Macnee, who played both roles in US television movies.

Cast

References

External links

 
 
 
 
 
 

1933 films
1930s mystery thriller films
American black-and-white films
American mystery thriller films
1930s English-language films
Films directed by Edwin L. Marin
Films produced by Samuel Bischoff
Films set in London
Films shot in Los Angeles
Sherlock Holmes films based on works by Arthur Conan Doyle
1930s American films
Films with screenplays by Robert Florey